Gordon R. Fisher (July 21, 1895 – October 8, 1980) was an American football, basketball, and track coach. He served as the head football coach at North Central College from 1926 to 1942, compiling a record of 69–48–13. Fisher also coached basketball and track at North Central. He was the head track coach at Indiana University Bloomington from 1944 to 1961. At Indiana, he was also and assistant football coach under head coach Bo McMillin. Fisher died on October 8, 1980, at Beverly Manor Nursing Home in Sun City, Arizona.

Fisher played football and ran track at the University of Minnesota.

Head coaching record

Football

Notes

References

External links
 

1895 births
1980 deaths
American football ends
American football fullbacks
American football guards
Indiana Hoosiers football coaches
Indiana Hoosiers track and field coaches
Minnesota Golden Gophers football players
Minnesota Golden Gophers men's track and field athletes
North Central Cardinals athletic directors
North Central Cardinals football coaches
North Central Cardinals men's basketball coaches
North Dakota Fighting Hawks football players
Northern State Wolves football players
People from Pembina County, North Dakota
Players of American football from North Dakota
Track and field athletes from North Dakota